Luis Barrios (born September 21, 1990), is a Peruvian professional basketball player.  He currently plays for the Faraday Club of the Liga de Basket de Lima.

He represented Peru's national basketball team at the 2016 South American Basketball Championship, where he was his team's best passer.

References

External links
 FIBA.com profile
 Latinbasket.com Profile

1990 births
Living people
Peruvian men's basketball players
Point guards
People from Moquegua